The Japan national team have competed in every Rugby World Cup since the inaugural tournament in 1987. They are so far the only team to reach the Rugby World Cup through Asian regional qualifying. In 2019, they progressed to the quarterfinals for the first time in their participation, making them the first Asian team to do so in the tournament.

Their best performance was in the 2015 Rugby World Cup. Japan beat South Africa 34–32 in their first match of pool play, in what was described as the "greatest Rugby World Cup shock ever". They went on to beat Samoa and the United States in pool play. They won three games out of four in pool play, the same as Scotland and South Africa, but unlike the other two, Japan did not get any bonus points, so the other two qualified for the quarter-finals.

Japan's first victory was a 52–8 win over Zimbabwe at the 1991 tournament under coach Hiroaki Shukuzawa.  Their worst defeat came at the 1995 Rugby World Cup, when they lost to New Zealand by 145–17, in a defeat blamed for setting the development of rugby union in Japan back by several years.
Since then, in the 2003 World Cup, held in Australia, Japan coached by Shogo Mukai was hailed as the best of the so-called 'minnow' nations, gaining many new Japanese and overseas fans in the process, though the team still failed to win any games. In the 2007 Rugby World Cup, Japan managed a last-minute conversion to draw with Canada, and avoided coming last in Pool B. They did not win any games however, and did not reach the knockout stage of the tournament.

Japan hosted the tournament for the first time at the 2019 Rugby World Cup, reaching the quarter-finals.

By position

By match

1987

1991

1995

1999

2003

2007

2011

Japan lost to New Zealand, Tonga and France, but managed to draw with Canada.

2015

2019 

Quarter-final

Hosting
At a special IRB meeting held in Dublin on 28 July 2009, Japan was announced as the host for the 2019 Rugby World Cup.

List of planned stadia
In addition to the nine venues located in Japan, one venue each from Singapore and Hong Kong have also been proposed to host five matches respectively.
Nissan Stadium, Yokohama (72,000)
Nagai Stadium, Osaka (50,000)
Chichibunomiya Rugby Stadium, Tokyo (27,000)
Yurtec Stadium Sendai, Sendai (20,000)
Level-5 Stadium, Fukuoka (23,000)
Toyota Stadium, Toyota (45,000)
Sapporo Dome, Sapporo (41,000)
Home's Stadium, Kobe (34,000)
Hong Kong Stadium, Hong Kong (40,000)
Singapore Sports Hub, Singapore (50,000)

References
 Davies, Gerald (2004) The History of the Rugby World Cup (Sanctuary Publishing Ltd,
 Farr-Jones, Nick, (2003). Story of the Rugby World Cup, Australian Post Corporation,

Japan national rugby union team
Rugby World Cup by nation